The Soninke language (Soninke: Sooninkanxanne), also known as Serakhulle or Azer or  Maraka, is a Mande language spoken by the Soninke people of Africa.  The language has an estimated 2.1 million speakers, primarily located in Mali, and also (in order of numerical importance of the communities) in Senegal, Ivory Coast, The Gambia, Mauritania, Guinea-Bissau, Guinea and Ghana. It enjoys the status of a national language in Mali, Senegal, The Gambia and Mauritania.

The language is relatively homogeneous, with only slight phonological, lexical, and grammatical variations.

Linguistically, its nearest relatives is the Bozo language , which is centered on the Inner Niger Delta.

It is possible that the language of the Imraguen people and/or the Nemadi dialect are dialects of, or closely related to, Soninke.

Phonology

Consonants

Vowels 

Long vowels are written double: aa, ee, ii, oo, uu.

References

External links
PanAfriL10n page on Soninke
Soninkara.org: La langue soninké
Collection of documents in Soninke
Decree No. 2005-991 of 21 October 2005 relating to the spelling and the separation of words in Soninke via the website of the Senegalese Journal officiel 

 
Languages of Mali
Languages of the Gambia
Languages of Mauritania
Languages of Senegal
Languages of Ivory Coast
Languages of Ghana
Languages of Guinea
Languages of Guinea-Bissau
Languages of Burkina Faso
Mande languages